Port Huron Northern High School (PHN; Northern) is a high school located in Port Huron, Michigan, United States. It is part of the Port Huron Area School District and serves grades 9-12.

Demographics
The demographic breakdown of the 1,264 students enrolled in 2014-2015 was:
Male - 50.2%
Female - 49.8%
Native American/Alaskan - 1.1%
Asian/Pacific islanders - 1.9%
Black - 4.3%
Hispanic - 2.9%
White -88.7%
Multiracial - 1.4%

22.5% of the students were eligible for free lunch.

Athletics
The Port Huron Northern Huskies colors are blue and gold. They compete in the Macomb Area Conference. The following MHSAA sanctioned sports are offered:

Baseball (boys')
Basketball (girls' and boys')
Bowling (girls' and boys')
Boys' state championship - 2007
Competitive cheer (girls' and boys')
Cross country (girls' and boys')
Football (girls' and boys')
Golf (girls' and boys')
Gymnastics (girls' and boys')
Ice hockey (boys')
Lacrosse (boys')
Soccer (girls' and boys')
Softball (girls')
Swim and dive (girls' and boys')
Tennis (girls' and boys')
Girls' state championship - 1996, 1997, 1999, 2000, 2002, 2013
Track and field (girls' and boys')
Volleyball (girls' and boys')
Wrestling (girls' and boys')

Facilities

Performing arts center
The school auditorium was rebuilt in 2005 and rededicated as a performing arts center. The expansion cost $7 million, and the expanded center can seat 650 people. The performing arts center is almost identical to the one at Port Huron High School, but the interior colors are different.

Radio station

The school radio station is WORW, which broadcasts on the FM band at 91.9 MHz.

References

Public high schools in Michigan
Educational institutions established in 1964
Schools in St. Clair County, Michigan
1964 establishments in Michigan